Virgiliu Postolachi (born 17 March 2000) is a Moldovan professional footballer who plays as a forward for Liga I club UTA Arad and the Moldova national team.

Club career
A youth academy product of Paris Saint-Germain, Postolachi joined Lille on 18 July 2019. He signed a four-year deal with Les Dogues and was initially assigned to the reserve side of club.

Postolachi joined Belgian club Mouscron prior to 2020–21 season. He made his professional debut on 8 August 2020 in a 1–1 draw against Antwerp. On 31 January 2021, Postolachi was loaned out to Danish 1st Division club Vendsyssel for the rest of the season.

On 20 July 2022, Romanian club UTA Arad announced the signing of Postolachi on a two-year deal.

International career
Postolachi previously rejected call-ups from Moldova national team in the past. Romania have tried to make him part of their national team setup, but didn't receive permission from UEFA and FIFA.

In January 2021, Postolachi joined training camp of Moldova under-21 team and played in a friendly against Sfîntul Gheorghe. He made his senior debut on 25 March 2021 in a 1–1 draw against Faroe Islands.

Personal life
Born in Moldova, Postolachi moved to France at the age of two. He holds Moldovan, French and Romanian citizenship.

Career statistics

International

References

External links
 

2000 births
Living people
People from Edineț District
Moldovan footballers
Moldova international footballers
Naturalized citizens of France
Moldovan emigrants to France
Moldovan people of Romanian descent
French people of Moldovan descent
Association football forwards
Paris Saint-Germain F.C. players
Lille OSC players
Royal Excel Mouscron players
Vendsyssel FF players
FC UTA Arad players
Belgian Pro League players
Championnat National 2 players
Danish 1st Division players
Liga I players
Moldovan expatriate footballers
Moldovan expatriate sportspeople in Belgium
Moldovan expatriate sportspeople in Denmark
Expatriate footballers in Belgium
Expatriate men's footballers in Denmark